Chrissie White (23 May 1895 – 18 August 1989) was a British film actress of the silent era. She appeared in more than 180 films between 1908 and 1933. White married actor and film director Henry Edwards in 1922, and in the 1920s the two were regarded as one of Britain's most newsworthy celebrity couples. Edwards directed more than 20 of his wife's films. The couple had two children, a son and a daughter, actress Henryetta Edwards. White starred in the 1920 film The Amazing Quest of Mr. Ernest Bliss, which as of August 2010 is missing from the BFI National Archive, and is listed as one of the British Film Institute's "75 Most Wanted" lost films.

Selected filmography

 The Vicar of Wakefield (1913)
 The Man Who Stayed at Home (1915)
 The Nightbirds of London (1915)
 Sweet Lavender (1915)
 Her Boy (1915)
 A Bunch of Violets (1916)
 Molly Bawn (1916)
 The White Boys (1916)
 Sowing the Wind (1916)
 The Failure (1917)
 Her Marriage Lines (1917)
 The Man Behind 'The Times' (1917)
 The Poet's Windfall (1918)
 Possession (1919)
 City of Beautiful Nonsense (1919)
 The Kinsman (1919)
 Broken in the Wars (1919)
 The Amazing Quest of Mr. Ernest Bliss (1920)
 John Forrest Finds Himself (1920)
 Wild Heather (1921)
 Tit for Tat (1921)
 The Bargain (1921)
 The Lunatic at Large (1921)
 Simple Simon (1922)
 Boden's Boy (1923)
 The Naked Man (1923)
 The World of Wonderful Reality (1924)
 Lily of the Alley (1924)
 Call of the Sea (1930)
 General John Regan (1933)

References

External links

1895 births
1989 deaths
British film actresses
English film actresses
English silent film actresses
Actresses from London
Burials at Westwood Village Memorial Park Cemetery
20th-century English actresses